Toshiyuki Miyama (born October 31, 1921) is a Japanese jazz clarinetist and bandleader.

Career 
Miyama played in a Japan Maritime Self-Defense Force band during World War II. After the war, he joined the Lucky Puppy Orchestra. He led his own ensemble from 1950; initially called Jive Ace, the group expanded to big-band size and changed its name to the New Herd in 1958. The ensemble's arranger was Kozaburo Yamaki. New Herd recorded with Charles Mingus in 1971 and toured worldwide throughout the 1970s and 1980s. Miyama led the ensemble for more than fifty years, continuing to perform into the 2000s.

References
Footnotes

General references
 Yozo Iwanami/Kazunori Sugiyama, "Toshiyuki Miyama". The New Grove Dictionary of Jazz. 2nd edition, ed. Barry Kernfeld

Japanese jazz clarinetists
Japanese jazz bandleaders
1921 births
People from Chiba (city)
Japan Maritime Self-Defense Force personnel
Japanese centenarians